The canonical situation of the Society of Saint Pius X (SSPX), a group founded in 1970 by Archbishop Marcel Lefebvre, is unresolved.

The Society of Saint Pius X has been the subject of much controversy since 1988, when Bernard Fellay, Bernard Tissier de Mallerais, Richard Williamson and Alfonso de Galarreta were illicitly consecrated at Ecône, at the International Seminary of Saint Pius X as bishops in violation of canon law. Lefebvre and the four other SSPX bishops individually incurred a disciplinary latae sententiae excommunication for the schismatic act; the excommunications of the four living SSPX bishops were remitted in 2009.

Talks between the society and the Holy See are at an impasse, and the Holy See considers that the society has broken away from communion with the Catholic Church. The Holy See has granted to all priest members of the society the faculty to give sacramental absolution validly to those who attend its churches and has authorised local ordinaries to grant permission for celebrating marriages of followers of the society (see sections on faculties below). However, cardinal Müller, then Prefect of the Congregation for the Doctrine of the Faith, has stated in a letter to the SSPX dated 26 June 2017 that full re-establishment of communion is conditional on its members making the 1998 profession of faith, accepting explicitly, with the degree of adhesion due to them, the teachings of the Second Vatican Council and subsequent church teachings, and recognising not only the validity but also the legitimacy of the rite of Mass and the other sacraments celebrated according to the liturgical books promulgated after that council.

The society, on the other hand, maintains that it was canonically established and has never been canonically suppressed, and that, in "the present crisis in the Church", when "heresy, and even apostasy, is widely spread amongst the clergy", "the Church mercifully supplies jurisdiction" for the good of the faithful.

1988 protocol

In May 1988, Archbishop Marcel Lefebvre and Cardinal Joseph Ratzinger as Prefect of the Congregation for the Doctrine of the Faith signed a protocol intended to regularize the canonical status of the SSPX. The first part of the protocol was doctrinal in which Lefebvre agreed that the SSPX would:
promise fidelity to the Catholic Church and its pope
accept the doctrine of the magisterium found in Lumen gentium section 25
pledge to avoid all polemics and to have a positive attitude of study and of communication with the Holy See
recognise the validity of the Mass and of the sacraments as promulgated by Popes Paul VI and John Paul II
promise to respect the common discipline of the church and her laws, including special provisions granted to the SSPX

The second part of the protocol was juridical which negotiated rights and responsibilities of the SSPX as a group, and conditions of individuals affiliated with the SSPX that included that:
the existing SSPX would be canonically erected as a clerical society of apostolic life of pontifical right within the Latin Church with special provisions for public worship, care of souls, and other apostolic activity
the statutes of the canonical society of apostolic life would require approval by the pope to assure doctrinal compliance
either the local bishops or the Holy See would confer SSPX priests jurisdiction "with regard to the faithful"
the canonical society of apostolic life would be granted the right to celebrate Tridentine liturgical rites
lay SSPX adherents would "remain under the jurisdiction of the diocesan bishop" but could request sacraments administered by SSPX priests
a special seven member pontifical commission, which would include two SSPX members, would be established to coordinate relations with the Curia and diocesan bishops, to resolve problems and conflicts, and to "exercis vigilance and lending assistance to consolidate the work of reconciliation and to regulate questions relative to the religious communities having a juridical or moral bond with" the SSPX
a proposal to licitly consecrate an SSPX member as a bishop would be submitted to John Paul II
the Superior General of the society of apostolic life would send dimissorial letters to any bishop who agrees to ordain members of the society of apostolic life
an amnesty could be granted to illicit SSPX places of worship which were erected without the authorization of the local bishops
convalidation of existing invalid marriages celebrated by SSPX priests could be resolved by decree
regularization of existing illicit ordinations of SSPX priests could be resolved by decree

Ratzinger and Lefebvre suggested in the protocol that:
the consecration of an SSPX member as bishop seems useful for "practical and psychological reasons"
on the doctrinal level, the superior general should not be the SSPX member who would consecrated as bishop but should be a member of the pontifical commission for stability

The protocol was to be submitted to John Paul II for his approval. However, Lefebvre declared his intention to consecrate a bishop as his successor, even without a pontifical mandate.

Holy See's view

Following the 1988 episcopal consecrations without a pontifical mandate, Pope John Paul II declared that the illicit consecrations were a schismatic act which "impli in practice the rejection of the Roman primacy" and that all six bishops involved in the ceremony had incurred automatic excommunication under the 1983 Code of Canon Law. John Paul II wrote, in Ecclesia Dei, that "the root of this schismatic act can be discerned in an incomplete and contradictory notion of Tradition." John Paul II reminded "that formal adherence to the schism is a grave offence against God" and schism is a delict against religion and the unity of the church with a penalty of excommunication.

Ecclesia Dei commission

At the same time, John Paul II set up the Pontifical Commission Ecclesia Dei (PCED) to help SSPX members and adherents who wished "to remain united to the Successor of Peter in the Catholic Church while preserving their spiritual and liturgical traditions" to enter "full ecclesial communion".

Pontifical Council for Legislative Texts

In 1996, the Pontifical Council for the Interpretation of Legislative Texts (PCILT) responded to an enquiry from Bishop Norbert Brunner, of the Diocese of Sion, Switzerland, that "in the case of the Lefebvrian deacons and priests there seems no doubt that their ministerial activity in the ambit of the schismatic movement is a more than evident sign of the fact that the two requirements" for formal adherence to the schism "have been met". The PCILT added: "On the other hand, in the case of the rest of the faithful it is obvious that an occasional participation in liturgical acts or the activity of the Lefebvrian movement, done without making one's own the attitude of doctrinal and disciplinary disunion of such a movement, does not suffice for one to be able to speak of formal adherence to the movement." It stated that its judgment was about the existence of the sin of schism, since for the existence of the canonical crime of schism, which entails excommunication, the conditions listed in canons 1323–1324 of the 1983 Code of Canon Law must also be met.

Likelihood of schism
In 1999, the PCED stated that it was likely, but not certain, that the SSPX members were adhering to a schism, which would mean that they were excommunicated, but that people who, "because of their attraction to the traditional Latin Mass and not because they refuse submission to the Roman Pontiff or reject communion with the members of the Church subject to him", attended Mass celebrated by SSPX priests, were not excommunicated, although, the longer they frequented SSPX chapels, the greater the likelihood of imbibing a schismatic mentality that would seem to involve adherence to the schism and so excommunication. The PCED judged that documentation sent to it in 1998 clearly indicated the extent to which "many in authority in" the SSPX conform with the formal definition of schism.

Moral impediment
In 1995, PCED explained that it "morally illicit for the faithful to participate in" SSPX Masses "unless they are physically or morally impeded from participating in a Mass celebrated by a Catholic priest in good standing" and added that not being able to assist at a Tridentine Mass "is not considered a sufficient motive for attending such Masses." The PCED explained that although the ordinations of SSPX priests by SSPX bishops are valid, SSPX priests are prohibited from exercising a priestly function because SSPX priests are not incardinated into local diocese or religious institutes which are in full communion with the Catholic Church. The PCED also explained that the Masses celebrated by SSPX priests are valid but illicit, and that Penance and Matrimony by SSPX priests are invalid because SSPX priests lack conferred faculties.

Separation but not schism
Apart from the formal declarations by the Catholic Church, Cardinal Darío Castrillón Hoyos, president of the PCED, commented about the status of the SSPX in a 2005 interview that the 1988 consecrations, without a pontifical mandate, created a "situation of separation ... even if it was not a formal schism." Castrillón Hoyos commented in 2005, about a 2004 meeting between Pope Benedict XVI and Fellay, that it was said at that meeting that, in Castrillón Hoyos words, "It cannot be said in correct, exact, and precise terms that there is a schism. ... They are within the Church. There is only the fact that a full, more perfect communion is lacking ... a fuller communion, because communion does exist." Castrillón Hoyos commented in 2007, when asked "Does the Indult support ecumenism, 'ad intra' (internal)?" Castrillón Hoyos answered that he "reject the term 'ecumenism ad intra'." He explained that the SSPX priests and adherents "are not schismatics" since:

2009 declaration of no canonical status and no legitimate ministry
In 2009, Pope Benedict XVI reaffirmed that: "Until the doctrinal questions are clarified, the Society has no canonical status in the Church, and its ministers – even though they have been freed of the ecclesiastical penalty – do not legitimately exercise any ministry in the Church."

On 20 November 2016, Pope Francis personally extended for priests of the society, until further provisions are made, the faculty by which "those faithful who, for various reasons, attend churches officiated by the priests of the Priestly Fraternity of Saint Pius X, can validly and licitly receive the sacramental absolution of their sins", a faculty he had already granted for the duration of the 2015–16 Jubilee Year. Confession, along with marriage, requires the granting of the required faculty for validity: "The valid absolution of sins requires that the minister have, in addition to the power of orders, the faculty of exercising it for the faithful to whom he imparts absolution" (1983 Code of Canon Law 966.1).

In a document from the Congregation of the Doctrine of the Faith, published on 4 April 2017, local ordinaries are authorized to grant SSPX priests faculties to validly assist at marriages. For validity of marriage, marital consent must be declared "before the local ordinary, pastor, or a priest or deacon delegated by either of them" (Canon 1108). 

For any priest, other than the pastor (parish priest) or local ordinary of the parties, to be "competent to assist", he must receive the faculty from the parties' pastor or local ordinary. The 2017 letter from the Congregation of the Doctrine of the Faith specifically grants local ordinaries (not the pastors) permission, in some  circumstances, to delegate SSPX priests to assist at the celebration of marriages of faithful who follow the pastoral activity of the society. Insofar as possible, the local ordinary is to delegate a priest of his diocese (or at least "a fully regular priest") to receive the consent of the parties during the marriage rite, which is then followed by Mass celebrated perhaps by a priest of the society. If this is not possible and "if there are no priests in the Diocese able to receive the consent of the parties, the Ordinary may grant the necessary faculties to the priest of the Society who is also to celebrate the Holy Mass".

Sanctions at the diocesan level

In 1991 Bishop Joseph Ferrario, of the diocese of Honolulu, declared that six adherents of the SSPX movement were excommunicated for, among other things, procuring the services of SSPX bishop Richard Williamson to illicitly administer confirmation. They sought hierarchical recourse from the Holy See to reverse the decree. The Holy See found in a review of the case that the submitted facts of the case were not formal schismatic acts so the decree lacked foundation under the cited canons and was therefore invalid.

In 1996 Bishop Fabian Bruskewitz (one of the first American bishops to allow the traditional Mass after the Novus Ordo mass became widespread), of the diocese of Lincoln, Nebraska, issued a warning that Catholics within the diocese who are "members" of the SSPX incur excommunication. He included them with other groups such as those who campaign for abortion. In correspondence with the SSPX he described them as a 'non catholic cult' and a 'sect'. 

In 2014, Bishop Marcello Semeraro, of the diocese of Albano, Italy, issued a warning that Catholics within that diocese would incur excommunication for attending SSPX Masses or receiving sacraments from SSPX priests "because the society has no canonical status."

SSPX and Holy See's view

Absolution of sins and assistance at marriage
To absolve sins legally, a priest must be given the faculty to do so, a faculty that, normally, only the local bishop can give. Similarly, in normal circumstances a marriage can be contracted validly only in the presence of the local bishop or the parish priest or of a priest or deacon delegated by one of these. To overcome this difficulty, the SSPX argues that absolution and marriage under its auspices are valid, because of its interpretation of canon law.

The Pontifical Commission Ecclesia Dei explained that the sacraments of Penance and Matrimony are invalid because SSPX priests are not granted faculty to administer those sacraments, but that the principle of common error applies to the sacrament of Penance, so if a recipient is genuinely ignorant that the priest in question lacks the faculty to absolve. Such private letters to individuals do not have the force of law for the faithful in general. However, "statements of dicasteries and organisms of the Holy See which touch on faith and morals are not considered infallible, but should be taken as norms of moral certitude."
In a letter dated 23 May 2008, the PCED stated:

Extraordinary Jubilee of Mercy confessions
During the Extraordinary Jubilee of Mercy, which started in December 2015 and lasted for a year, Pope Francis established that those people who approach SSPX priests to hear their confession during the jubilee "shall validly and licitly receive the absolution of their sins." The Pope also granted all priests "the discretion to absolve" from the sin of abortion (which usually must be absolved either by the bishop, or by priests authorized to do so by him – there are usually, but certainly not always, many of those made available).

In November 2016 in Misericordia et misera, Francis announced that he had "personally decided to extend this faculty beyond the Jubilee Year, until further provisions are made, lest anyone ever be deprived of the sacramental sign of reconciliation through the Church's pardon."

Canonical censures on members

The Holy See lifts excommunication of bishops
Lefebvre died in 1991 as an excommunicated person. In their 2008 petition, the four surviving SSPX bishops "acknowledged the supreme authority of the Holy Father, and noted that 'the current situation causes us much suffering'." In 2009, the Congregation for Bishops remitted the excommunication of the four surviving SSPX bishops. "By definition, their request carried with it an acknowledgement of the Pope's authority over the Church here on earth." Pope Benedict XVI explained that the SSPX has no canonical status in the Catholic Church for doctrinal reasons and that SSPX ministers "do not legitimately exercise any ministry in the Church."

Suspension a divinis
Although the 1988 excommunication of the four SSPX bishops was remitted in 2009, the SSPX bishops and priests were still unable to exercise any episcopal or priestly ministry in the Catholic Church.

According to canon 1383 of the 1983 Code of Canon Law, a suspension a divinis affects SSPX clergy who have been ordained to the priesthood illegitimately.

Notes

References

Society of Saint Pius X
Catholic canonical structures
Canon law history
Catholic penal canon law
Sacramental law